The 1986 Michigan Attorney General election was held on November 4, 1986. Incumbent Democrat Frank J. Kelley defeated Republican nominee Robert H. Cleland with 68.64% of the vote.

General election

Candidates
Major party candidates
Frank J. Kelley, Democratic
Robert H. Cleland, Republican
Max Dean, Independent

Results

References

Attorney General
Michigan Attorney General elections
November 1986 events in the United States
Michigan